Albert Neil Cleary (16 June 1919 – 20 March 1945) was an Australian soldier during World War II. Part of the 2/15th Field Regiment, Royal Australian Artillery, he became a prisoner of war to the Japanese following the Battle of Singapore. He died following an escape attempt in 1945. In 2001, the Australian Labor Party introduced a bill to have Cleary and two others awarded the Victoria Cross for Australia, however this was defeated by the Federal Liberal Government. In 2011, Cleary was awarded a posthumous Commendation for Gallantry. Cleary's death was revealed by historian Lynette Silver to have been caused by dysentery, calling into doubt his elevation as a war hero.

References 

1919 births
1945 deaths
Australian prisoners of war
Australian military personnel killed in World War II
People from Geelong
Australian torture victims
World War II prisoners of war held by Japan
Australian Army personnel of World War II
Deaths from dysentery
Australian Army soldiers
Burials at Labuan War Cemetery